The 2013 protests began in Pristina, Kosovo after in response to high electricity bills. Sparked by comments on social media, more than 1000 people gathered in front of Kosovo's Electricity Corporation building in February. The protests continued for several weeks, eventually turning into a protest against corruption. Some of the main slogans from the protest where "KEK pumping bills", "No country with thieves," and "Stop the theft, develop the state". In May, protests spread to other cities in Kosovo. The government responded cautiously during the protests, promising fulfillment of all requirements set by protesters.

Impact
Because of the protest, a planned increase of 5% for the electricity bill was halted. The Parliament started an investigation which resulted in a detailed report sent to the Government and Electricity Regulatory Authority of Kosovo. It was also seen as an notable protest because it was one of the rare ones in Kosovo started by the population without any involvement from political parties or NGO's.

See also
1981 protests in Kosovo
2014 student protest in Kosovo

References

External links
Kosovo Protests World Bank and U.S. Plans for New Coal, huffingtonpost.com
Government responds to corruption protests, SETimes's
Violent protest announced in Pristina, infoglobi.com

2013 protests
Protests in Kosovo
2013 in Kosovo
History of the Republic of Kosovo
2013 in politics